Myosin ATPase is an enzyme with systematic name ATP phosphohydrolase (actin-translocating). This enzyme catalyses the following chemical reaction

 ATP + H2O  ADP + phosphate

ATP hydrolysis provides energy for actomyosin contraction.

See also 
 Myosin

References

External links 
 

EC 3.6.4